Jason Alan Kilar (born April 26, 1971) is an American businessman. He was the CEO of WarnerMedia from May 2020 to April 2022. He was previously an Amazon executive, the founding CEO of the short-lived Vessel, and the CEO of Hulu.

Early life and education
Kilar was born on April 26, 1971 in Pittsburgh, Pennsylvania. His family moved to Boca Raton, Florida during his junior year and ended up graduating from Spanish River Community High School in 1989. He attended the University of North Carolina at Chapel Hill where he was a member of Sigma Nu Fraternity. He graduated in 1993 and continued his education at Harvard Business School, earning an MBA in 1997.

Career

Kilar served as an executive for Amazon from 1997 to 2006, including as the senior vice president of its worldwide application software division. He helped found the streaming company Hulu in 2007 and became its chief executive officer (CEO). On January 4, 2013, he announced his resignation from the company after five years, together with Hulu CTO Rich Tom. The next month, Kilar joined the board of directors for DreamWorks Animation.

In 2014, he announced Vessel, a subscription video service, where he was CEO and backed by investment companies Benchmark, Greylock Partners, and Bezos Expedition until the site was eventually sold to Verizon Communications in 2016.

On April 1, 2020, WarnerMedia then-CEO John Stankey announced that Kilar would be assuming the role effective May 1, 2020. Stankey announced that Kilar would be reporting to Stankey, who will remain COO of AT&T. On April 24, 2020, it was announced that Stankey will become the CEO of AT&T on July 1, 2020.

In December 2020, Kilar announced that Warner Bros. films released in 2021 would be released on a streaming service at the same time as they were released in theaters. The prior practice was to release films to theaters for a 90-day period before releasing them in other formats. The move was decried by many in Hollywood, including Christopher Nolan and Denis Villeneuve, while also being described as plainly violating the contractual rights of some of those who worked on the films. In March 2021, Kilar drew more ire by claiming that COVID-19 is "really good for ratings" in conversation with Fox Corporation's Lachlan Murdoch. He later apologized for making this comment and added that "I would like nothing more than for this pandemic to be well behind us".

Kilar announced on April 5, 2022 that he would be stepping down as the WarnerMedia CEO in face of the soon-to-be-completed merger of WarnerMedia and Discovery, Inc.

References

1971 births
American technology chief executives
Harvard Business School alumni
Living people
UNC Kenan–Flagler Business School alumni
Amazon (company) people
Businesspeople from Pittsburgh
American corporate directors
DreamWorks Animation people
Warner Bros. Discovery people
21st-century American businesspeople